Alvin Gardiner (born 11 February 1951) is a former professional tennis player from Australia.

Career
Gardiner was a quarter-finalist in the men's doubles at the 1968 Australian Open with Ross Case.

He continued to compete in every Australian Open until 1973, when he began to suffer a series of injuries and illnesses. It started with a season ending collarbone injury, a break that required a bone graft operation in London.  When he returned to action he caught glandular fever, in August 1974 he won the Exmouth Open, and then midway through the season he pulled a back muscle. He won the Exmouth Open singles title against Graeme Thomson in 1974 He made a comeback in 1975 and won the Irish Open that year, over Rhodesian player Tony Fawcett.

During his career he also featured in the French Open, Wimbledon and US Open tournaments. He was John McEnroe's first ever opponent in a Grand Slam singles main draw. They met in the first round of the 1977 French Open and the American qualifier won the match in straight sets. At the same tournament, Gardiner partnered Paul McNamee in the men's doubles. He made the second round of the Australian Open twice, the last of which was in 1979, when he lost to eventual champion Guillermo Vilas.

Personal life
Gardiner was born in Tara, Queensland, to Ann, a schoolteacher, and Fred, a grazier who became an artist known for his wood sculptures.

He is involved with coaching in the Toowoomba region.

In 2017 Gardiner published a book on his tennis career titled Aussie Journeyman: Memoir of a Touring Tennis Professional.

References

External links
 
 

1951 births
Living people
Australian male tennis players
Tennis people from Queensland
Sportspeople from Toowoomba
20th-century Australian people
21st-century Australian people